This is a list of characters of the Canadian children's television series Theodore Tugboat. The show has one human character, The Harbourmaster, and six central tugboat characters, led by the show's namesake, Theodore Tugboat. Other ships, of all sizes, provide a large number or regular and occasional characters along with a few living structures.

Main

The Harbourmaster
Along with all the duties of a real-life harbourmaster, The Harbourmaster is the host and narrator of the series, and provides voices for the entire cast of characters. He is the only human on the show, and is portrayed in the Canadian and US versions by the late Denny Doherty, formerly of The Mamas & the Papas, and by other performers internationally. The Harbourmaster introduces the theme at the beginning of every episode by addressing an issue that he has in common with the tugs. He also loves to play the tuba and is good friends with a man named "Rodney" (who never appeared in the series).

Tugboats
 Theodore, the title character  lives in the Big Harbour with all of his friends. He is one of the smaller tugs and is sometimes offended if someone calls him "cute" or "small". He and his closest friend Hank are the only two harbour tugs (tugs that are not yet eligible to work outside of the harbour). .  He's a kind little tugboat that is always friendly to the other ships in the harbour, with the goal of becoming friends with everyone he meets. His biggest dream is to become an ocean tug and to travel across the sea to different harbours, but before he does, he works as hard as he can to make the Big Harbour the friendliest harbour in the world. That's why he is always there whenever someone needs him. It's hinted that Theodore falls in love with Emily.
 Emily is the only female tug in the fleet. She wears an old turquoise fishing hat that is very special to her. She loves to travel to different countries and discover new cultures and languages. Emily loves to be admired, but hates to look silly in front of her friends because they always have high expectations for her, and look up to her as a leader. Still, she always comes to find that her friends are there to help her, even if she doesn't ask for their help. She usually gets into arguments with George, but they always resolve their differences in the end. No matter how upset Emily gets, she always shows her kind spirits and female strength. It's hinted that Emily may have feelings for Theodore.
 George is the largest and strongest tugboat in the Big Harbour. He wears a purple baseball cap on his head backwards. George loves to show off and can sometimes be a little rude without knowing it. He's somewhat stubborn and always struggles to admit that he is sometimes wrong. He especially loves to tell stories to the other tugs, mostly about himself. Whenever he gets irritated, he blows up a lot of smoke from his smokestack and makes loud noises with his powerful engines. Most of all, George is a hard worker, never finishes a job until it's done, and always stands up for his friends.
 Foduck is the harbour's safety tug. He wears a red fireman's hat and is equipped with extra bright spotlights, sonar transceiver and a fire hose. Foduck is always very serious and makes sure all jobs are being performed safely. Foduck is a V tug like George and Emily, meaning he is fully qualified to make ocean voyages, but is content with staying in the harbour to keep it safe. Because of his strong work ethic, Foduck usually doesn't express his feelings, but deep inside, he has a soft spot in his heart for everything and everyone in the harbour.
 Hank (the Volcano, as he sometimes calls himself) is the smallest, funniest, fastest tugboat in the Big Harbour. He wears a blue tuque and loves to make funny faces and noises as a way of getting attention. He can be very sensitive too, and usually gets ignored for being the smallest. Whenever he feels down, he always turns to Theodore for help or guidance. Hank was afraid of the dark once, but overcomes his fear when Theodore tells him that he was once afraid of the dark too. Sometimes Hank is the one to give a good idea without even knowing it. He also loves to use the word "fresh" to describe something. Out of all the other tugboats, Hank is special because of his good humour and nature to learn and grow from his mistakes.

The Dispatcher
 The Dispatcher is a rotating building on the "Great Ocean Tug and Salvage Company" wharf (modeled after the wharves of the former Foundation Maritime), who gives the tugs their jobs for the day. He has a black mustache and a flag on his head. He is usually very serious and stern with the tugs, but they are always respectful to him because of his fatherlike figure. He shows that he cares for the tugs by disciplining them for their faults, and by counselling them for their mistakes. And like a father, he always has a gentle side to him, and is always there when the tugboats need his help the most.

Other

Barges
 Bobby is a green salvage barge, who like all the other barges, is good friends with the tugs, and always quiet. Bobby occasionally helps out with Rebecca's salvage operations when Shelburne is on assignment. He is very encouraging and once lifted George's spirits when he didn't win an award.
 Barrington is the smallest barge in the Big Harbour. He is always quiet like all the other barges, and is best friends with Theodore. The two have a special game of hide and surprise, but once hid too long and got into trouble. Barrington looks up to Theodore as a leader, and never goes against his plans or ideas.
 Bayswater is a small green and blue barge that loves to make up funny names. He once called Hank a "bumper-bum", which got Hank into trouble when he called a ship "Needlenose". Bayswater is good friends with Brunswick Barge, but at one time didn't get along with him. The two are now very close, and are usually pulled by Theodore and Hank.
 Bonavista is a small red barge who usually works with Hank. She is always calm and content with whatever goes on. Carla the Cabin Cruiser once towed Bonavista to a little cove as a way of getting attention.
 Brunswick is a large orange/brown barge that's always looking for thrills and chills. Brunswick quickly changed his mind when he was swept away by a storm and thought that he had been swallowed by a giant snorkel clam.
 Guysborough is a grumpy garbage barge who always describes everything as "rotten". Theodore and Digby are the only ones that can stand Guysborough's grouchiness. His way of calling Theodore's name is by saying "Theee-o-dooore!", and Theodore once tricked him into using his catchphrase as a foghorn to prevent a shipwreck. Guysborough usually gets advice from his good friend Jasper, and says to him "I thought so too". Even though Guysborough is a smelly old garbage barge, the tugs appreciate him for keeping the harbour so nice and clean.
 Shelburne is a giant sea barge designed for longer journeys on the open ocean. He sometimes requires two tugs to move. He has a very slow and sluggish nature which is epitomized by his slow speech. Shelburne is often seen helping the tugs raise items up off the ocean floor and back to the surface.

Buoys
 Bedford is a small buoy that marks the place where the harbour ends and the ocean begins. He and Theodore are best friends, and they love to tell knock-knock jokes to each other. Even though Bedford is not able to move, he sometimes has fun adventures, like when his chain broke and he drifted out of the harbour. Even so, Bedford also suffers from depression because he's unable to move, and once wanted to leave the harbour. That is why every ship in the Big Harbour stops by every day to say hello and talk with Bedford. Whenever Bedford feels useless, the tugs are always there to remind him just how important he really is.
 Blankton is a buoy who needed repairs when Elo Echo was coming.
 Bingham is a buoy-in-training who Hank bumped into one time.
 Blandford is a marker buoy at the outermost edge of the harbour, who serves as the first entry point for incoming ships. He is friends with Bedford Buoy, even though they never see each other and rely on passing ships to pass communications to each other.
 In the episode "Theodore Changes Sides", the Dispatcher assigns Theodore and Hank to move the broken buoys. One was black with a flag on it, the other was green, twisted, and had eyes. The green twisted buoy can be seen at the junk dock in some other episodes. The broken buoys never speak.

Others
 Bluenose is a schooner sailing ship that lives in the Big Harbour and holds the title of "the fastest ship in the harbour" (considering that she has no engine). Bluenose is good friends with the tugs and loves to race with them. She even helped Foduck when his propeller was clogged in seaweed. Bluenose is modelled after Bluenose II, a replica of the famous racing-and-fishing schooner featured on the Canadian ten-cent piece.
 Constance is a coast guard ship who takes almost everything seriously. Whenever her name is mentioned, she is noted as an important ship. The tugs used to think that Constance was mean, and Constance used to think that she was too busy to be nice. Emily soon showed her how easy it was to be friendly, and became Constance's best friend. Even though Constance is very serious about her work, she can also be a lot of fun (like when she played light tag with Theodore and Hank). The tugs are now more comfortable socializing with Constance, but still give her all their respect.
 Carla is a zany cabin cruiser who only works to please herself. She loves to give the tugs funny nicknames and usually refers to the Dispatcher as the "Dishwasher". Carla is always looked at as 'cool' because she's never afraid to do what she wants. She occasionally runs out of control and creates peer pressure amongst the tugs. Carla mainly hangs out with Emily, and loves to go exploring with her. Whenever Carla goes over the line, Emily is usually the one to tell her so, and Carla always knows when she has made a big mistake.
 Digby is an old cable ship who is always getting stuck somewhere on the job. It's always a surprise to him and the tugs when someone other than himself gets stuck. He has a thick Newfoundland accent and his catchphrases are "Oh flibberty jibberty!" and "Oh my starfish and little oysters" (like Owan). His best friend is Theodore, who always seems to have to rescue Digby whenever he gets stuck. He loves to say whatever is on his mind, and especially enjoys talking about cables. The tugs once thought of Digby as old and useless when the big and strong Dartmouth came to the harbour. Even though Digby is always getting stuck somewhere, he always shows that he is still a useful cable ship in the end.
 The Flat Eyed Coast Guard Ship is the coast guard ship that has flat eyes. He is seen close up in the episode "Theodore and the Queen". Later, his model was used for Constance.
 Nautilus is a navy ship (a St. Laurent-class destroyer, specifically) who lives in the harbour, close to Rebecca's dock. George used to be shy around him, because Nautilus is a very important ship. He is the sleekest and the fastest ship in the Big Harbour.
 Northumberland is a naval submarine who sleeps during the day and works during the night. He is hardly ever awake in view of the tugs, except for when Theodore and Hank saw him on their night shift. Northumberland is a very quiet sub too, and hates loud noises and bright lights. He also helps the salvage crew (Theodore, Rebecca and Shelburne) to find great things underwater. He never likes to disappoint his friends, which can sometimes get him or his friends into danger. He once broke his propeller in an underwater rockslide, and showed Hank where a sunken ship was. Northumberland is also a big brother-like figure to Pugwash the Mini-Sub, but was once scared that she would bump him. Northumberland is always a great help to the tugs and the salvage crew, and whether he's awake or half-awake, he is always willing to be of some assistance to anyone in the Big Harbour.
 Phillip and Filmore are two identical ferry boat twins that cross the harbour before Benjamin Bridge. The twins are modelled after the twin Halifax Transit ferries Halifax III and Dartmouth III which were built in 1979 to carry passengers across Halifax Harbour on a daily basis. No one in the Big Harbour is able to tell which twin is which, and they usually finish each other's sentences. Phillip and Filmore are sometimes stubborn, and at one point, Filmore left the harbour to visit Fundy the Fishing Boat. Their job is very well recognized, and every tug and ship is careful when they cross between them.
 Pearl and Petra are the harbour's only two pilot boats. They patrol the harbour and supervise the tugs with moving ships to their docks. They both used to have a problem with not listening to the tugboats, which caused a lot of confusion. Pearl was the first pilot boat to come to the harbour. She expects a little too much from the tugs and can be very strict with them. She used to be taken as mean and boring until she played a fun game with Theodore. Petra was the second pilot boat to come to the harbour and has a closer relationship with the tugboats. She was shy at first, about coming to the Big Harbour, until Theodore introduced her to everyone. She also enjoys playing "hide and surprise" with Theodore and Barrington on occasion. Both are hard working, and work together with the tugs to keep the harbour running properly.
 Rebecca is a research vessel who explores everything about the ocean. Rebecca had three different models throughout the first two seasons. She started out with a grey colour and had no eyebrows in season one. In season two, her eyes were bigger, and her eyebrows were thick and grey, but later had smaller eyes and grey eyebrows. She is great at giving facts and information about the ocean, and once advised Theodore to let Walter the Whale return to his family. Rebecca is the leader of the salvage team and works with Theodore, Northumberland, and Shelburne to find great things underwater. Rebecca has no trouble finding underwater treasures with her special sonar equipment. She and the salvage team once found and old ship's bell. Theodore looks up to Rebecca because she always does everything close to perfect. Rebecca also has a grumpy side, which she showed when Benjamin Bridge kept her up all night with his loud snoring. Even though Rebecca is not perfect, she is always fun to explore with, and is the tugs closest guide to the mysteries of the sea.
 R. Boat (short for rowboat) is a gloomy little rowboat that Theodore found stuck on some sharp rocks. R. Boat's dock had been destroyed during a big storm, and Theodore promised him a new home. R. Boat complains very often and hates loud noise. He became good friends with the cruise ship Queen Stephanie when it was discovered they both shared a fondness for a certain dock and a dislike for clams.
 Sigrid is a supply ship that takes supplies to Owan the Oil Rig out on the ocean. She is orange with a helicopter on her head, and is especially good at making waves. Sigrid is very good friends with the tugboats and has always wanted to be a tugboat herself. She got her chance when she helped Theodore and Emily dock a ship in a storm by pushing the ship with her waves. The tugs gave Sigrid a green bumper to wear on her side, but instead, she put the bumper on her wheelhouse to remind her of the time when she was a tugboat too.

Non-watercraft
 Owan is a loudmouth, boisterous, Barney Fife-type, oil rig that works outside the Big Harbour. He has eight big pillars and is hooked onto giant anchor cables. He's full of free expression and always yells instead of talking. The tugs usually have to remind him to be a little more quiet. The funny thing, is Owan never knows when he's too loud. His catchphrases are "Yessireebob!", "Nosirreebob!" and "Oh my starfish and little oysters!" Owan is always happy and cheerful (except for when Oliver came to take him to work), and sometimes careless (like when he broke free from his cables and nearly hit a cliff).
 Benjamin is a green suspension bridge at the end of the harbour who loves to watch everything that goes on. His design is based on the Angus L. Macdonald Bridge, the first of two bridges built to connect Halifax with Dartmouth. He also enjoys telling jokes, riddles and rumours, which can cause a lot of confusion. Besides spreading rumours, Benjamin has a bad habit of snoring very loudly. Even though he can't move, Benjamin has many exciting moments, like Tex the Oil Rig nearly crashing into him, or the time the Queen Stephanie got stuck beneath him. He's very good friends with the tugboats and loves to socialize. In the episode "Theodore and the Big Harbour" he was a bully and called Theodore a put-put, but learned a lesson after Theodore blew smoke in his face and was saved from Tex the oil rig by Theodore and George. Benjamin is seen in every episode, but only talks in a few (Theodore and the Big oil Rig, Theodore and the Queen, Theodore and the Borrowed Bell, and Theodore and the Northern Lights) to name a few.
 Donald is the wooden dock across from the Dispatcher, and also happens to be his best friend. Donald is special because he only uses the words "uh-huh" and nothing else. The Dispatcher and the tugs sometimes go to him for advice and occasionally get the right answer from him. His name is a pun on Donald Duck, a popular character from Disney.
 Jasper is the garbage dock who is the exact opposite of Donald, because the only thing he can say is "nope". Jasper is a good friend of Guysborough, who always turns to Jasper for advice, even when his answer is always "nope".

Characters outside the Big Harbour
 This bullfrog lives in a cove outside the harbour.
 Truro is a fishing trawler who lives and cares for Dorothy Dory in Ceilidh's Cove. Truro is kind, friendly and always willing to provide advance, guidance, and help to the other boats wherever he feels they require it. He keeps a particularly watchful eye on Dorothy, as the young dory tries to find her way around, while muddling through her mistakes and mishaps.
 Dorothy is a dory who lives in Ceilidh's Cove with Truro, who looks to both Truro and Theodore as older siblings. Dorothy is always loud and bursting with questions for Theodore and all the other tugboats. Dorothy also got to have a "girls night out" with Emily, Sigrid, and Carla.
 Fundy is a little fishing boat who says strange things. It is really his way of giving advice. Fundy and Theodore often spoke in the series, and the Ferry Twins have met him by travelling to his cove.
 Baddeck is a buoy boat who brings new buoys into the harbour. Theodore was once jealous of Baddeck and his relationship with Bedford and Blandford, but they soon became friends.
 Halliburton is a houseboat who lives in an enclosed cove near the Big Harbour. Theodore once thought Halliburton was a haunted houseboat, making him scared. Thanks to Foduck, Theodore and Halliburton became fast friends.
 Millie is a fishing trawler who wears red glasses. When she arrived in the harbour, she caused some trouble with her bad eyesight, but gained two friends, Theodore and Hank.
 When Pugwash was hiding from Lunenburg Lighthouse she discovered the Rock Brothers (three pairs of eyes in the underwater cave). They surprised her when they mentioned her fear of foghorns. They have only appeared in the episode "Theodore's Big Decision".

Visitors to the harbour

Oil tankers
 Olympia is an oil tanker brought in when huge packs of sea ice were in the harbour. She almost ran into Willy's Island when Theodore's towrope snapped.
 Linda is an oil tanker that arrives the same time each week. She is towed in by Theodore and Hank, and led into the harbour by Foduck and Pearl.
 Canso Colossus: Apparently the "King of Supertankers". He talks with a squeaky voice and his pet peeve is "yucky stuff". He almost left the harbour when he saw garbage floating in the water. He once hit rock near the Pictou Peaks and had to be saved by Nautilus. In the episode "Sigrid and the Bumpers, he was mistaken for a female container ship.
 Igloo is an oil tanker who helped the tugs when Clair began to leak oil.

Container ships
 Caroline is a container ship that Foduck and Emily had trouble with, while trying to get her to her dock, until George came to help them.
 Caraquet is a container ship that Theodore had trouble keeping steady when George was doing tough tugging. Caraquet had many speaking roles (she appears to have a British accent), including a time when she, Theodore, and Hank had a good laugh when George made a funny noise.
 Catherine is a big container ship who carried a double load, and gave Theodore and George a difficult time trying to move her.
 Chester is a blue and red container ship who wanted to have flags during the time the ships and boats of the harbour were having their flag day.
 Cocomagh is a container ship who was afraid to come into the harbour until Foduck convinced her that the Big Harbour was the friendliest harbour in the whole world.
 Colchester is a green container ship that Theodore and Emily were helping bring into the harbour when Hank was suffering with the hiccups.
 Clementine is a big container ship who came when Theodore first met Clayton, and wished that he could lift things like he could. Clementine becomes paranoid whenever anything happens to one of her containers.
 Cumberland is a big container ship with special engines (port thrusters) that allows him to dock himself. He thought he did not need tugs until he met Theodore.
 Elo Echo is a blue container ship that Theodore saved when she was about to hit sharp and dangerous rocks, by flashing his light and blowing his horn. She appeared in the episode "Is Anybody Listening".
 Gloria Cornwallis is a ship that Emily and Theodore were towing during a time when Theodore was having nightmares of a sea monster coming at him in the night. She was also brought in during the time that Foduck was bumping Theodore, as well as a time when George and Emily wouldn't talk to each other.
 Isabel is a grey container ship who was seen in several episodes. Isabel was never introduced properly.
 Jennifer is a ship that Emily rescued before Theodore got an assignment to rescue Digby, who was stuck on a sandspit.
 Margaree Pride is a container ship that George and Theodore helped out of the harbour, the day after Theodore first arrived.

Cargo ships
 Annapolis is a cargo ship brought into the harbour when the tugs first met Sigrid the Supply Ship. Her name has no relation to Emily's middle name (which is also Annapolis).
 Cabot is a cargo ship who illegally came into the harbour by himself, dropping cargo, and caused chaos in the harbour. He gave Theodore a hard time until he ran aground on the sandy beach.
 Clair is a cargo ship that is loaded with special cargo such as bicycles.
 Emma Sophia is a small red and grey ship loaded with kumquats, who Theodore was to bring into the harbour. She made many cameos in the fifth season.
 Freda is a small red cargo ship that got stuck on some rocks outside the harbour, but Theodore and George teamed up to pull her to safety. She was the first ship Theodore brought in by himself, when he was the "Tug in Charge".
 Inverness is a cargo ship that Hank accidentally offended by calling him "Needlenose".
 Julia is the first cargo ship that Theodore and Hank brought into the harbour together. She was loaded with vegetables. After the episode "Theodore the Vegetable", she made cameos in the first season.
 Katherine is a red cargo ship who, like Emily, had never met a ship from Russia until Gregor was in the harbour. She also once said that Theodore's whistle was cute.
 Kingston is a cargo ship who has visited the harbour on one or more occasions. He was once frightened of Hank.
 Kirby is a nervous grey cargo ship loaded with telephone poles from England who got nervous when Theodore approached him too quickly. He appeared in the episode "Theodore's First Pull".
 Louise is a cargo ship that Theodore and George brought in, the first time they heard that Petra the new pilot boat was coming to live in the harbour.
 S.S. Malarkey is a cargo ship who tells stories that, true to his namesake, are nothing but malarkey. 
 Margaret is a large green cargo ship that visits the Big Harbour occasionally. She was seen with Theodore and Hank when they were lost in a thick fog, as well as being pulled by George and Emily most of the time.
 Scally is a ship who brought a cargo of treasures into the harbour. When he gave the tugs some of his treasures, it didn't take long for them to cause confusion. So they decided to return their treasures back to Scally.
 Seabright is a cargo ship that was afraid of things that he has never done before. He feared that he would get stuck under Benjamin Bridge (since he had never gone under a bridge before) until Theodore explained there was nothing to be afraid of. After Seabright overcame his fear of Benjamin, he soon became frightened of Clayton, since he had never been loaded or unloaded by a crane before.

Other visitors
 Cabot's Cargo: After Cabot had let some of the cargo fall off his deck, Theodore felt bad, until the cargo spoke to him, Various pieces included a cylinder-like container, a crate, an open shipping container, and a red pipe. Some cargo stayed on his deck that also had faces. There was also a blue container, and what appears to be a water heater.
 Dartmouth is a giant cable ship who won the attention of all the tugboats when he first arrived in the Big Harbour. Digby showed him good places to lay cables. When it was time for him to leave, Theodore felt very sad until he realized that he's not losing a companion, but gaining a friend in a whole new place.
 Gregor is a fishing trawler from Russia whom Emily wanted to meet. His model was later used for Truro.
 Kulu is a storytelling canoe who Theodore and Foduck rescued after a storm blew him up on a beach. Kulu is a great, mysterious storyteller and knows many stories like the story of The Northern Lights. He always tells his stories at hidden cove. He used to be unliked by Foduck, because he did not think his stories were real. However, ever since Foduck saw The Northern Lights for real, Kulu has become another one of his many good friends.
 Oliver the Vast is a tug from a different harbour who mistreated everyone, especially Theodore. Later, the Dispatcher sends him back home for bullying. After his appearance in the episode "Theodore and the Bully", his model was used for Sigrid the Supply Ship in the next season.
 The Mysterious Grain Ship is a ship that made cameos in the first season. In the episode "Theodore the Vegetable", he cuts off Julia. He is also seen in the episode "Theodore and the Queen", when all the boats are whistling. He does not speak.
 Pugwash is a yellow mini-sub who scared Northumberland by bumping him, but later decided to stop. She is good friends with Theodore, Hank, and Northumberland. She doesn't like foghorns, and once hid from Lunenburg in the Ecum Secum Circle where she met the Rock Brothers. Owan says that she's as cute as a "catfish's kittens".
 Queen Stephanie is the greatest and grandest ocean liner in the world, also the nicest. Occasionally visits the harbour after getting stuck beneath Benjamin Bridge by accident, the first time she appeared in the series. In another, she even had R. Boat in her swimming pool after he wished he could be big. Apparently, Her Majesty has about 1,001 windows on each of her sides. The queen holds a special place in her heart for Theodore. She is based on the RMS Queen Elizabeth.
 Shamus is an Irish fishing trawler that was once covered in ice, and later, when the ice melted, struck up a friendship with George.
 Snorri is a Viking ship that arrived in the Big Harbour. The tugs were afraid of him because he snorted at them, until they realized that Snorri is different from the other boats who live in the Big Harbour.
 Stewiacke is the ship that carries Pugwash out in the ocean. He likes to explore the ocean with Pugwash as his underwater aid.
 Tex is an oil rig that was really rude until a storm nearly made him crash into Benjamin Bridge, after which he learned humility.
 Walter is possibly a pilot whale or false killer whale (due to his black color), Walter the Whale was separated from his pod by a strong current. Theodore had been babysitting him until George found his family. Walter was returned to his pod before he grew to a tremendous size. He is featured in the book "Theodore and the Whale".

Buildings and structures
 There are some buildings in the harbour with faces, but have never been spoken of or had the chance to speak. These include the red warehouses and the long blue house.
 The Clock Tower is the harbour's clock tower. He is seen in many episodes but only speaks in the episode "Big Harbour Fools' Day", where the audience learns he is the Tugboats' personal wake up call. He is modelled after the historic Halifax Town Clock on Citadel Hill.
 Clayton is a crane who lives under Benjamin Bridge. Clayton is very nice, and is a good friend of the tugboats. There once was a time when Theodore wanted to be just like Clayton. In some episodes, Clayton does not have a face.
 Lilly is a lighthouse on Willy's Island, found in the middle of the harbour, warns visiting ships away from the sharp dangerous rocks on the island. Although she doesn't appear as often as some of the other characters, it is possible that Lilly's character is a nod to Lillie Lightship of Tugs, as both characters use large beacons to warn ships of the fog, and their names are both Lillie/Lilly.
 Lunenburg is a lighthouse that lives near Shipwreck Rock. Pugwash was once scared of Lunenburg's bright light and loud foghorn. Lunenburg was also seen the time that Theodore was separated from Pearl in the thick fog near Shipwreck Rock.
 Shediac is a supply shed Theodore met while he was at the repair dock. He supplies the tugboats their bumpers. Shediac is also Hank's friend.

Characters not seen
 Rodney is the Harbourmaster's friend who works in the harbour. He plays the bagpipes and is in The Big Harbour Band.
 Molly the Vehement is a tug from a different harbour that won the "tug of the year" award. George says that she is a hard worker. She was only mentioned in the episode "Tug of the Year".
 Natalie Explorer is a ship who was mentioned by the Harbourmaster in the episode "George and the Underwater Mystery".
 Conrade Explorer is a ship mentioned in the episode "Theodore's Big New Friend".
 Aunt Ruby is Rodney's aunt, who he was trying to call in the episode "Hank Hurts a Ship", but kept calling the Harbourmaster by accident.
 Hillary is a mail lady. She delivered cookies to the Harbourmaster in the episode "Bedford's Big Move", and a binder in the episode "Guysborough's Garbage".
 The Harbourmaster's mom: The Harbourmaster has talked to his mother on the phone. He thanked her for the cookies in the episode "Bedford's Big Move". In the episode "Emily and the Rocket", the Harbourmaster mistakes her for the person at the oil refinery, and says she's being rude.

Other boats
 Junk Barge is a grimy barge full of junk, at Old Dock No.9.
 Kamel is an old cable ship that was seen in some season one episodes. It was first seen in "The Dark and Scary Cove". Later, it was in the episode "True Blue Friends" were Theodore, Foduck, and Emily took it to the junk dock. The last episode it was in, was "Great Harbour Cleanup Contest", where it was underwater, and George tried to tow it away. Kamel has a face, but no eyes (meaning that it is dead). Its model was later used as "Digby the Cable Ship" in "George's Ghost".

See also
 Theodore Too

References

Theodore